DWSK (96.7 FM), broadcasting as 96.7 K-Lite, is a radio station owned and operated by Beta Broadcasting System. The station's studio and transmitter are located at #3 Upper Market, Camp Allen, Baguio.

This station operates daily from 5am to 10pm.

References

Radio stations established in 1990
Radio stations in Baguio